Exelastis pavidus is a moth of the family Pterophoridae. It is known from South Africa.

The species was described by Edward Meyrick in 1908. Its type locality is Polokwane, South Africa.

It has been regarded as a junior synonym of Marasmarcha bonaespei.

Distribution
In addition to South Africa, this species has also been found in the Budongo Forest and Minziro Forest of Uganda.

References

Endemic moths of South Africa
Exelastini
Moths of Africa
Moths described in 1908
Taxa named by Edward Meyrick